Urmson is a surname. Notable people with the surname include:

Chris Urmson, Canadian engineer, academic, and entrepreneur
Fred Urmson (1907–1985), English footballer
J. O. Urmson (1915–2012), British philosopher and classicist

See also
Urmson & Thompson, a defunct steam engine manufacturing company